Puran Rana Tharu is a Nepalese politician, belonging to the Communist Party of Nepal (Maoist). In the 2008 Constituent Assembly election he was elected from the Kanchanpur-1 constituency, winning 14765 votes.

In the 2013 Constituent Assembly election Tharu was fielded as the 181st candidate on the proportional representation list of the Unified Communist Party of Nepal (Maoist).

References

Living people
Communist Party of Nepal (Maoist Centre) politicians
Year of birth missing (living people)

Members of the 1st Nepalese Constituent Assembly